Leila Carmelita Arcieri (born December 18, 1973) is an American actress, model and businesswoman. She was Miss San Francisco in the 1997 Miss California pageant and has appeared in many films such as XXX, Wild Things 2 and Daddy Day Care.  Arcieri is the founder and president of the natural sweetener brand STIR Sweetener. She played Jamaica St. Croix on Son of the Beach (2000–2002).

Early life
Arcieri was born in San Francisco, California, the daughter of a mother named Anita Van Buyten. She has Italian, Jewish, African-American, and Native American ancestry.

Career
Arcieri was crowned Miss San Francisco in 1997, and soon after she began appearing in both commercials (including 1-800-COLLECT and Starburst) and music videos with the likes of Boyz II Men, The Isley Brothers, Montell Jordan, and Q-Tip. Such work eventually brought her to the attention of writer-producer Timothy Stack, who cast her in the role of Jamaica St. Croix in his new series, Son of the Beach, a parody of Baywatch. That same year Leila was selected as the Coors Lite Beer 2000 spokesmodel.

In 2005, she was voted No. 65 on Maxim magazine's Hot 100 list.

Filmography

Film

Television

Music videos

References

External links

American film actresses
American television actresses
Actresses from California
American people of Italian descent
Actresses from San Francisco
1973 births
Living people
African-American actresses
21st-century African-American people
21st-century African-American women
20th-century African-American people
20th-century African-American women